This is a list of endorsements for declared candidates in the Democratic primaries for the 1928 United States presidential election.

Alfred Smith

James Reed

Walter George

Thomas Walsh

Albert Ritchie

Evans Woolen

References

1928 United States Democratic presidential primaries